Jorge Grosser Castillo (born 8 July 1945) is a Chilean middle-distance runner. He competed in the men's 1500 metres at the 1968 Summer Olympics.

References

1945 births
Living people
Athletes (track and field) at the 1967 Pan American Games
Athletes (track and field) at the 1968 Summer Olympics
Athletes (track and field) at the 1971 Pan American Games
Chilean male middle-distance runners
Olympic athletes of Chile
Place of birth missing (living people)
Pan American Games competitors for Chile